Gabonibacter is a genus from the family of Porphyromonadaceae which have been isolated from human sources.

References

Bacteroidia
Bacteria genera